Aan (Hindi: आन, Urdu: آن, translation: Pride), released as The Savage Princess in the United Kingdom and United States, is a 1952 Indian Bollywood adventure film, produced and directed by Mehboob Khan. It was India's first technicolor film, as it was shot in 16mm Gevacolour and was blown up in Technicolor. It stars Dilip Kumar, Nimmi, Nadira (in her debut role), Premnath. It was the most expensive Indian film ever at the time, subsequently becoming the highest grossing Indian film ever, a record it held for several years.

It was the highest-grossing Indian film ever at the time, domestically and overseas. Aan was the first Indian film to have a worldwide release in many countries, subtitled in 17 languages and released in 28 countries, including the United Kingdom, United States, France, and Japan. The film also received critical acclaim in the British press at the time. In South India, it was also dubbed and released in Tamil with the same title, Aan.

Plot
The plot centers around an Indian royal family, which consists of the Maharaj (Murad), his brother Shamsher Singh (Premnath) and sister Rajshree (Nadira). A local young man named Jai Tilak (Dilip Kumar) enters a contest to tame Princess Rajshree's horse, and after he is successful, Shamsher challenges Jai to a bout of fencing. Jai is declared the winner of the match after much dispute and Shamsher is enraged at losing to a poor villager. Jai falls in love with Rajshree and tries to woo her, but despite being attracted to him the princess's arrogance prevents her from revealing her true feelings.

Shamsher, who counted upon becoming the ruler after the Maharaj's death, becomes enraged when Maharaj reveals that he plans to abolish the monarchy and make the kingdom a democracy.

Shamsher then plans to gain control of the kingdom by killing the Maharajah on the night before he is due to travel to England for a medical procedure. However, he is unsuccessful after the Maharajah escapes an attempt on his life by Shamsher's henchmen and disguises himself as a servant in his own palace.

Shamsher then sets his eyes on Mangala (Nimmi) who is a village girl and a childhood friend of Jai's. Mangala loves Jai, but her love is not reciprocated as he is in love with princess Rajshree. Mangala is kidnapped by Shamsher Singh who plans to keep her as his prisoner in his palace. Before he can assault her, Mangala commits suicide by drinking a bottle of poison. Jai tries to kill Shamsher to avenge Mangala's death. After Shamsher apparently dies, Jai provokes Princess Rajshree to launch an attack on his village to avenge her brother's death. Jai manages to kidnap Rajshree in the confusion. He sets out to teach her a lesson by taking her to his village and forcing her to live as a peasant. Just when Rajshree begins to realize what a peasant's life is like and begins to admire Jai, Shamsher Singh reemerges and seeks to get revenge against Jai.

Production
This prestigious production was to be India's first full feature in Technicolor. The film was made with an extremely large budget. Dilip Kumar,
Nimmi and Prem Nath, then at the height of their popularity and success, were quickly signed on for starring roles, but the second female lead proved more troublesome to cast. Initially, Nargis was cast but left the film to concentrate on her association with R. K. Studios. For a time Madhubala was considered, with considerable lobbying from Dilip Kumar who was romantically involved with her at the time, but for reasons unknown, she was never cast. Finally Mehboob Khan decided to launch a newcomer and selected the then unknown Nadira and promoted her as his new star discovery.

When a first edit of the film was shown to the film's financiers and distributors, they objected that Nimmi's character died too early. This was due to Nimmi's vast popularity as an actress. Therefore, a lavish and extended dream sequence was filmed and edited in to give Nimmi more prominence and screen time in the film.

It was the most expensive Indian film ever at the time.

Innovative music of Naushad
A major highlight of Aan is Naushad's music - both music of film songs and the grand background score that was so innovative and played a key role in the box office success of this film. Reportedly Naushad used a 100-piece orchestra while recording the music of this film, something unprecedented in those days. To create the sound effects that had better bass, Naushad had special rugs put on the walls of the sound studio. Finally, the film songs were mixed in London. Naushad worked very long hours for three whole months to complete this film's music. The symphony with the 100 musicians was much praised and even played on the BBC Radio.

Cast
Dilip Kumar as Jai Tilak 
Nimmi as Mangala
Nadira as Princess Rajeshwari 
Premnath as Prince Shamsher Singh
Sheela Naik as Maid of the princess
Mukri as Chandan
Murad as Maharaja
Cuckoo as Dancer
Amir Banoo as Jai's Mother

International release
Aan was the first Indian film to have a worldwide release in many countries with the English title - Savage Princess. It was subtitled in 17 languages, and released in 28 countries. Its distribution in the United Kingdom and Europe was handled by Alexander Korda. The film had a lavish London premiere, attended by Mehboob Khan, his wife Sadar Akhter, and Nimmi. The English version was entitled Savage Princess. On the London trip, they met many Western film personalities, including Errol Flynn. When Flynn attempted to kiss Nimmi's hand, she pulled it away, exclaiming, "I am an Indian girl, you cannot do that!" The incident made the headlines, and the press raved about Nimmi as the "...unkissed girl of India". The premiere was also attended by the British prime minister Lord Attlee, among other Indian and British elites at the time.

Although Nimmi was not the romantic lead, she made a big impact on audiences, and her character, Mangala, emerged as the most popular in the film. This was to such an extent that, when the film was released dubbed in French in 1954, it was retitled Mangala, fille des Indes (Mangala, the Girl of India) and Nimmi was promoted as the main star of the film in the theatrical posters and trailers for the French language release. One reason for her popularity was the incident with Errol Flynn which made headlines. Nimmi further revealed in a 2013 interview, that at the London premiere of Aan, she received four serious offers from Hollywood, including from Cecil B. DeMille who greatly admired the production design and Mehboob's vision as a director. He was in fact, so impressed by the film, that he personally wrote a letter of commendation to Mehboob Khan praising the film and the performances of Nimmi, Dilip Kumar and Nadira in particular.

Aan was also released in Japan in January 1954, as the first Indian film to ever release in Japan. Aan was accepted by audiences there, and it earned a considerable profit in Japan.
In 1995, This Movie was telecast aboard TV Premier on Bangladesh Television on the occasion of a Personal visit of Dilip Kumar & Saira Banu in Bangladesh.

Music

The film features an acclaimed soundtrack composed by Naushad.

Hindi/Urdu lyrics were by Shakeel Badayuni

The Tamil lyrics were by Kambadasan. Lata Mangeshkar and Shamshad Begum rendered the Tamil songs also. However, it appears that the lyricist did not approve of their diction, and so songs sung by Lata Mangeshkar were recorded again with M. S. Rajeswari and songs sung by Shamshad Begum were recorded with Soolamangalam Rajeswari. While the film had the original recordings, the records (Plates) had both versions. So, there are 14 songs recorded on the gramophone records.

Reception

Box office 
Domestically in India, it was the highest grosser of 1952, grossing 2.8crore ($5.88million). It was the highest-grossing film in India at the time, and the first to net 1.5crore. It held the record for several years, until it was surpassed by Shree 420 (1955).

It was also an overseas success, earning considerable profit from overseas. In overseas markets, the film was released in 28 countries and earned  ($162,410). In Japan, the film earned  in ten days following its release in January 1954, the highest for an Indian film in the territory at the time. Aan was the highest-gross Indian film overseas at the time, until it was surpassed by Awaara (1951) after its Soviet release in 1954.

Worldwide, the film grossed . Adjusted for inflation, this is equivalent to crore. It was the highest-grossing Indian film ever at the time, up until it was surpassed by Awaara after its Soviet release in 1954.

Critical reception 
Aan received critical acclaim in the British press at the time. The Times, for example, wrote a positive review of the film, comparing it favourably with Hollywood productions at the time. They stated that "Hollywood has nothing to reach up to handsome Dilip Kumar and seductive Nadira."

Hollywood producer Cecil B. DeMille himself wrote a letter to Mehboob Khan saying, "I believe it is quite possible to make pictures in your great country which will be understood and enjoyed by all nations without sacrificing the culture and customs of India. We look forward to the day when you will be regular contributors to our screen fare with many fine stories bringing the romance and magic of India."

Notes

References

External links
 
Movie Review of Aan (1952) (Archived) - University of Iowa - Indian Cinema website
 Aan (1952) on YouTube

1952 films
1950s Hindi-language films
1950s Urdu-language films
Films directed by Mehboob Khan
Films scored by Naushad
Indian action drama films
Indian epic films
War epic films
Indian swashbuckler films
Indian action war films
Films about royalty
Indian historical adventure films
1950s historical adventure films
1950s action drama films
1950s action war films
Urdu-language Indian films